Brushy Bill Roberts (August 26, 1879 – December 27, 1950; claimed date of birth December 31, 1859) also known as William Henry Roberts, Ollie Partridge William Roberts, Ollie N. Roberts, or Ollie L. Roberts, was an American man who attracted attention in the late 1940s and the 1950s by claiming to be Western outlaw William H. Bonney, also known as Billy the Kid (who actually died in 1881). Roberts' claim was rejected by the governor of New Mexico, Thomas J. Mabry, in 1950. Brushy Bill's story is promoted by the "Billy the Kid Museum" in his hometown of Hico in Hamilton County, Texas.  His claim was explored in a 2011 episode of Brad Meltzer's Decoded and a segment by Robert Stack in 1989 on Unsolved Mysteries.

Background
In 1948, a probate investigator from St. Louis, William V. Morrison, located an elderly man named Joe Hines, who had claimed the lands of his deceased brother. Hines told Morrison of his experiences in the Lincoln County War, and surprised him by claiming that Billy the Kid was still alive, but refused to reveal the name he had assumed or exactly where he was living. Morrison continued his search for the man who claimed to be Billy the Kid, and in 1948, an elderly man named J. Frank Dalton in Lawton, Oklahoma, claimed to be Jesse James, and said Billy the Kid was still alive in Hamilton, Texas, where he was known as O. L. Roberts.

Morrison then began a correspondence with Roberts, who eventually "confessed" to being the Kid, and detailed his supposed exploits as an outlaw. He told anecdotes that if true would fill in undocumented gaps in many aspects of the life of Billy the Kid, and asked for Morrison's help in acquiring the full pardon he said he had been promised by New Mexico Governor Lew Wallace in 1879, but which was subsequently withdrawn. He showed his ability to slip out of handcuffs, and said that Pat Garrett had actually shot and killed another gunslinger named Billy Barlow and had passed his body off as the Kid's, which had allowed the Kid to vanish and escape to Mexico. The only three witnesses to the alleged killing of the Kid by Pat Garrett were Garrett himself and Deputies John W. Poe and Thomas McKinney. While McKinney claimed to slightly know the Kid, Poe had never previously laid eyes on him. Within moments after the shooting by Garrett, Poe told Garrett he had "shot the wrong man";  since it was too dark in the room for a visual identification, Garrett claimed he knew it was the Kid by his voice, though all present had only heard whispers.  Ultimately, both Poe and McKinney agreed with Garrett, but McKinney recanted years later and claimed like Poe before him that Garrett had killed someone else. Local residents of Fort Sumner also immediately disputed the death of the Kid. Garrett hastily assembled an official inquest by political cronies, and clinched his claim to the killing and all outstanding rewards. The body was quickly buried the following day in a grave that vanished in floods over the years; the grave as marked today likely contains no remains at all and requests for an exhumation have been officially denied.

Roberts told Morrison that he would agree to tell the "whole truth" in exchange for the full pardon that Billy the Kid had been promised by Wallace following the Lincoln County War. His sudden appearance and request for a pardon had a profound effect on Garrett's descendants. Brushy Bill claimed to have been born William Henry Roberts in Buffalo Gap, Texas, near Abilene, on December 31, 1859, but was known to use several other aliases during his life.

Marshall Trimble, the official historian of Arizona, cites Frederick Nolan, an authority on the life and times of Billy the Kid, who refers to a letter sent in 1987 by Mrs. Geneva Pittmon to Joe Bowlin, the founder of a history buff group called the "Billy the Kid Gang, Inc.", in which she stated that her uncle, the man known as "Brushy Bill", was named Oliver P. Roberts, and that he was born August 26, 1879, according to the family Bible.

Writer W. C. Jameson, a Brushy Bill enthusiast, claims that Brushy Bill's actual name was William Henry Roberts, and that Oliver Pleasant Roberts was not the same person as "Brushy Bill", although Roberts's niece definitively stated that her uncle "Brushy Bill" was named Oliver P. Roberts, and was not Billy the Kid.

If Brushy Bill had been born in 1859, he would have been 90 at the time of his death from a massive heart attack in Hico, Texas. Had he been born in 1879, he would have been only 71 at the time of his death. In addition, Roberts had allegedly claimed to be a member of Jesse James's gang, before deciding to come out as the authentic Billy the Kid. In January 1950, Brushy Bill claimed he was a member of the James–Younger Gang as a teenager, and identified J. Frank Dalton as Jesse James.

Morrison vouchsafed that upon examination of Roberts's stripped body, he showed 26 bullet and knife scars. Morrison also attempted to track down former Jesse Evans gang member Jim McDaniels, and located him in Round Rock, Texas. McDaniels, along with Severo Gallegos, Martile Able and Jose Montoya, all of whom had known Billy the Kid, signed affidavits verifying their belief that Roberts was, in fact, Billy the Kid. Bill and Sam Jones declined to sign such affidavits, Sam Jones begging off with the statement, "Received your letter, and am sorry but feel that I can't sign your affidavit. I'm old and I just don't feel like being obligated so..." Bill Jones' grandson expressed doubts about the veracity of Roberts' claims in a letter of refusal written on his grandfather's behalf. Billy the Kid could read and write English, and was fluent in spoken Spanish. Brushy Bill himself was illiterate with a moderate proficiency in Spanish.

Mabry announced the meeting, which was covered by the press. Mabry announced that he did not believe Roberts' story, and denied the pardon application. The press attention and the trip from his home in Hico to Santa Fe had a negative effect on the elderly Roberts' health, and he died soon afterwards.

Brushy and his story were largely forgotten until the movie Young Guns II depicted him as the narrator of events surrounding the life and times of Billy the Kid and the Lincoln County War. More books were written on the mystery, and researchers began exploring whether Brushy's claim might have actually been true, including several failed attempts to obtain permission for exhumation and DNA testing.

Numerous books have been published since 1950 examining Brushy's claim, the first of which was Alias Billy the Kid, written by Morrison and the Western historian C.L. Sonnichsen, but virtually every single one was based upon Pat Garrett's published account from 1882, and  Garrett's book, mostly a concoction of factual material mixed with fabrications written by Roswell's postmaster, Ash Upson, established the Kid legend for subsequent decades. The Sonnichsen book received mixed reviews at the time, but did win support from former President Harry S. Truman, who wrote to Morrison indicating he believed that Brushy was Billy the Kid and lamenting that he died before being able to go in front of the next governor, where he may have gotten a more favorable result. In 2005, W.C. Jameson, himself a student of C.L. Sonnichsen, re-examined the subject and released Billy the Kid: Beyond the Grave. Jameson's work led to increased interest in and study of Roberts's story, most notably that of former Lincoln County deputy sheriff and mayor of Capitan, New Mexico, Steve Sederwall. In April 2015, media personality Bill O'Reilly weighed in on the topic by publishing his book Bill O'Reilly's Legends and Lies: The Real West, in which he suggests that the evidence in favor of Brushy Bill Roberts outweighs the accepted version of history, citing the original Alias Billy the Kid book by Morrison and Sonnichsen. O'Reilly followed up his book with an episode on the subject during his national television broadcast purportedly depicting the events that occurred during the alleged killing of the Kid from Brushy Bill's perspective.

Photograph
In 1989, the Lincoln County Heritage Trust commissioned a computer study by Robert L. Har and Dr. Thomas G. Kyle, who used an analytical process of his own creation instead of established protocols used by law enforcement. Scanned photographs of Billy the Kid and Roberts, along with those of 150 other people, were fed into a computer using a "similarity index" to match 25 facial "landmarks". This resulted in Roberts' photo ranking 42nd (i.e.: 41 other people more closely resembled the tintype than Roberts). Snow indicated that if the two were the same person, then Roberts should have ranked at least second. It was noted that the accuracy of facial comparisons is dependent on the position of the face in the photographs being the same.

In 1990, a study using photo comparison equipment at the Laboratory for Vision Studies and the Advanced Graphic Laboratory in the University of Texas was conducted by image experts Scott Acton and Alan Bovik. The study corrected for the facial positioning and used the same facial recognition system used by the FBI, CIA, and Interpol, which are claimed to provide a "significant level of statistical validity". Photographs of Brushy Bill Roberts at age 14 seemed to resemble the well-known Dedrick-Upham tintype of Billy The Kid. A photograph of Brushy Bill at age 71 was a 93% match. Both Acton and Bovik concluded that this result "irrefutably shows that Roberts and the Kid are a very close match". These findings, though, would have to be replicated to be scientifically conclusive (which to date has not occurred), and in that case would still not prove that Roberts and Billy the Kid were the same person. In 1996, the results of the study were presented to Andre McNeil, chancery judge of the 12th judicial district, and a prominent Arkansas attorney, Helen Grinder, who stated that based on the study and other evidence the case for Roberts being Billy the Kid was "strong", "substantial", and "excellent".

DNA

In 2003, Lincoln County Sheriff Tom Sullivan, Capitan, New Mexico Mayor Steve Sederwall, and De Baca County, New Mexico Sheriff Gary Graves began a campaign to exhume the remains of Billy the Kid and his mother, Catherine Antrim, to prove through DNA analysis that in fact Billy the Kid was buried in Fort Sumner. The initiative hit snags from the beginning, including the fact that no confirmation exists as to where the remains are located, and ensuing legal obstacles. The exhumation of both sets of remains was blocked in court in September 2004.

Hico, Texas
At the time of his death, Brushy Bill lived on West 2nd Street in Hico. He was buried in the county seat of Hamilton, 20 miles south of Hico. Despite the discrepancies noted above, the Hico Chamber of Commerce has capitalized on his claim by opening the "Billy the Kid Museum" in the historic Western section of Hico. In the downtown is a marker devoted to Brushy Bill: "Ollie L. 'Brushy Bill' Roberts, alias Billy the Kid, died in Hico, Texas, December 27, 1950. He spent the last days of his life trying to prove to the world what he claimed was his true identity, and to obtain the pardon promised to Billy the Kid by the governor of the territory of New Mexico (Lew Wallace).

In popular culture

See also

 Folklore of the United States
 The Authentic Life of Billy, the Kid
 Billy the Kid § Rumors of survival
 List of Old West gunfighters
 List of Old West lawmen

References

19th-century births
1950 deaths
American gold prospectors
American outlaws
American prospectors
People of the American Old West
People from Hico, Texas